Beka  is a settlement in the administrative district of Gmina Puck, within Puck County, Pomeranian Voivodeship, in northern Poland.

The first mention of the village was in 1523. Due to engineering of the river Reda in the 19th century, the sea-shore was changed and the village often flooded. This caused its population to decrease. After a fire in 1960 the village was abandoned.

For details of the history of the region, see History of Pomerania.

References

Beka